Hernán Humberto Godoy Véliz (born 14 May 1941), better known by his nickname Clavito Godoy, is a Chilean football manager and former footballer.

Career
A product of Deportes La Serena youth system, he made his debut at the age of 16. The matches against the traditional opponent, Coquimbo Unido, are well remembered, especially duels versus Arturo Canilla Díaz and Alfonso Pocho Morales. In Chile he also played for Santiago Wanderers, Palestino, Audax Italiano, Magallanes and Trasandino. Abroad he played for Comunicaciones in Guatemala, Motagua in Honduras, Alianza in El Salvador and Unión Magdalena in Colombia.

He made coaching courses in both Italy and France, becoming a prolific football manager who is Chilean who has coached more teams in his career with 25 different clubs in 5 countries: Chile, the United States, Guatemala, Vietnam and Indonesia. In addition he has worked as an assistant coach in Audax Italiano (1974), General Manager in San Antonio Unido (2009) and sports advisor in Independiente de Cauquenes (2012). On 1 August 2018, he joined San Marcos de Arica. As a football manager, he is well known by using a whiteboard to make the tactics.

Personal life
He is well known by his nickname Clavito (Little Nail).

He and his wife, Juana Paredes, have four children, three daughters and a son.

He has published two books: "La pizarra de Clavito" (The Little Nail's whiteboard) and "Un Clavo saca otro clavo" (A Nail removes another nail).

His grandsons, Emanuel López and Alejandro Muñoz, are professional footballers who made their professional debuts playing for Santiago Morning in  2017, when Godoy was the manager.

Honors

Club
Comunicaciones F.C.
 Liga Nacional de Fútbol de Guatemala (1): 1968–69

Individual
 Liga Nacional de Fútbol de Guatemala Top Scorer (1): 1968–69

References

External links
 
 Hernán Godoy at MemoriaWanderers 
 Hernán Godoy at PlaymakerStats

1941 births
Living people
People from Huasco Province
Chilean footballers
Chilean expatriate footballers
Chilean Primera División players
Primera B de Chile players
Deportes La Serena footballers
Santiago Wanderers footballers
Club Deportivo Palestino footballers
Audax Italiano footballers
Deportes Magallanes footballers
Magallanes footballers
Trasandino footballers
Liga Nacional de Fútbol de Guatemala players
Comunicaciones F.C. players
Liga Nacional de Fútbol Profesional de Honduras players
F.C. Motagua players
Primera División de Fútbol Profesional players
Alianza F.C. footballers
Categoría Primera A players
Unión Magdalena footballers
Association football forwards
Chilean football managers
Chilean expatriate football managers
Chilean Primera División managers
Primera B de Chile managers
Audax Italiano managers
Deportes Naval managers
Trasandino de Los Andes managers
Ñublense managers
San Luis de Quillota managers
Deportes Concepción (Chile) managers
Arturo Fernández Vial managers
Deportes Puerto Montt managers
San Marcos de Arica managers
Deportes Antofagasta managers
Santiago Wanderers managers
Deportes Melipilla managers
Unión San Felipe managers
Santiago Morning managers
Comunicaciones F.C. managers
Mitra Kukar managers
Chilean expatriate sportspeople in Guatemala
Chilean expatriate sportspeople in Honduras
Chilean expatriate sportspeople in El Salvador
Chilean expatriate sportspeople in Colombia
Chilean expatriate sportspeople in the United States
Chilean expatriate sportspeople in Vietnam
Chilean expatriate sportspeople in Indonesia
Expatriate footballers in Guatemala
Expatriate footballers in Honduras
Expatriate footballers in El Salvador
Expatriate footballers in Colombia
Expatriate soccer managers in the United States
Expatriate football managers in Guatemala
Expatriate football managers in Vietnam
Expatriate football managers in Indonesia
Chilean writers
Chilean male writers
Deportes Iquique managers